James Clarke (7 December 1923 – 12 December 2014) was an English professional footballer who played as a left back.

Career
Born in West Bromwich, Clarke signed for Nottingham Forest from Darlaston Town in May 1947. He later played for Boston United.

References

1923 births
2014 deaths
English footballers
Darlaston Town F.C. players
Nottingham Forest F.C. players
Boston United F.C. players
English Football League players
Association football fullbacks